Vas-Y Eddy (C'mon Eddy) is a 1967 Belgian song by Jean Saint-Paul about Belgian cycling champion Eddy Merckx. Its lyrics were written by Betty Young and the B-side, Quand Paris Sourit (When Paris Smiles) by Claude Bonheur and Jean Saint-Paul. It was released by the label Philips Records.

The song praises Eddy Merckx' victories and is notable for being the first recorded song about Merckx.

Sources

1967 songs
1967 singles
Belgian pop songs
French-language Belgian songs
Songs about Belgium
Songs about Eddy Merckx
Songs about bicycles
Cycling music
Cultural depictions of Eddy Merckx